Daniel H. Schulman (born January 19, 1958) is an American business executive. He is president and CEO of PayPal, formerly serving as group president of enterprise growth at American Express.  Schulman was responsible for American Express' global strategy to expand alternative mobile and online payment services, form new partnerships, and build revenue streams beyond the traditional card and travel businesses. Earlier, he served as president of Sprint's prepaid group and the founding CEO of Virgin Mobile.

Early life
Schulman was born in Newark, New Jersey to Jewish parents, and grew up in Princeton, New Jersey with two siblings, a brother Joel Schulman, and a sister, the late Amy Adina Schulman, who died in 1986. He was captain of the tennis and lacrosse teams at Princeton High School, and went on to receive a bachelor's degree in economics from Middlebury College, and an MBA from New York University Stern School of Business.

His mother, S. Ruth Schulman, was associate dean of Rutgers' Graduate School of Applied and Professional Psychology (GSAPP) from 1974 to 1999.  His father, Mel Schulman, was a chemical engineer.

Schulman once told The New York Times, "I was born with social activism in my DNA. My grandfather was a union organizer in the garment district in New York City.  My mother took me to a civil rights demonstration in Washington in my stroller."

Business background
Schulman began his business career at AT&T, working more than 18 years there and becoming the youngest member of the company's senior executive team. Schulman started at an entry-level account management position; when he left AT&T, he was president of the $22 billion consumer long-distance business, managing 40,000 employees.

He then became president and COO, and then CEO of Priceline.com. During his two years there, Priceline's annual revenues grew from a reported $20 million to about $1 billion.

In 2001, Richard Branson invited Schulman to become the founding CEO of Virgin Mobile USA, Inc. Schulman led the company from its national launch in 2002 to it becoming a public company in 2007, and ultimately its sale to Sprint Nextel in 2009. His tenure at the company was noted by the company's growth as the "no hidden fees" carrier. By the time Schulman left Virgin Mobile, it had become one of the nation's top wireless carriers, with more than 5 million customers and $1.3 billion in annual sales.  Following the sale of Virgin Mobile to Sprint Nextel, Schulman served as President of Sprint's Prepaid group until he moved to American Express.

On September 30, 2014, it was announced that Schulman would become CEO of PayPal, which would continue as a separate legal entity, split from eBay in 2015. His tenure was also marked by the $2.2 billion acquisition of European payment provider iZettle, PayPal's second largest purchase to date.  He has stated that his goals at PayPal include giving financial tools to the 70 million Americans underserved by the U.S. financial system.

During the 2018–19 United States federal government shutdown, Schulman initiated the idea for PayPal to offer $500 in interest-free cash advances to furloughed U.S. government workers, committing to provide up to $25 million in interest-free loans. In April 2019, Schulman announced PayPal's plans to invest $500 million in Uber to connect the two marketplaces. In November 2020, Schulman oversaw the launch of cryptocurrency purchasing and selling on PayPal.

In 2019, Schulman unveiled PayPal's Employee Financial Wellness initiative to help struggling workers by lowering healthcare costs, and creating avenues for employees to receive equity in the company to promote long-term saving. In 2020 he announced PayPal's $535 million commitment to support Black-owned businesses and minority communities in the U.S. in an effort to help close the racial wealth gap.

Schulman prohibited hate groups from using PayPal's platform from accepting payments or donations for activities that promote "hate, violence or racial intolerance".

PayPal had its strongest financial results ever in the first quarter of 2021. Schulman has announced plans to build on PayPal's successful quarter with a PayPal "digital wallet".

In February 2023, it was announced that Schulman will step down as PayPal CEO by 31st December 2023. He will reportedly remain to serve on the board of directors.

Board service
Schulman previously served as Non-Executive Chairman of NortonLifeLock (formerly Symantec Corporation). In September 2018, he was elected as a member of the Verizon Board of Directors. Schulman also served on the advisory committee of Greycroft Partners, a private equity company focused on early-stage new media and technology companies.

Schulman was on the Board of Governors of Rutgers University from April 2008 to June 2013. He also serves on the board at Autism Speaks, an advocacy group dedicated to advancing research into causes and treatments for individuals on the autism spectrum. Schulman serves as a Board of Directors member on the Business Roundtable and The Economic Club of New York, and is an International Advisory Council member of the Singapore Economic Development Board. He is a life member of the Council on Foreign Relations.

Politics
Schulman denounced the North Carolina Public Facilities Privacy & Security Act that mandated people in public facilities use bathrooms in accordance to their gender at birth. He stated that "The new law perpetuates discrimination and it violates the values and principles that are at the core of PayPal's mission and culture." Schulman also cosigned an opposition letter with about 120 executives from major corporations. In protest at the new law in North Carolina, Schulman announced that the company was canceling its expansion to hire 400 people in the state.

Dan Schulman wrote in the PayPal statement, "While we will seek an alternative location for our operations center, we remain committed to working with the LGBT community in North Carolina to overturn this discriminatory legislation, alongside all those who are committed to equality."

In 2018, to support Dreamers – people who entered the U.S. as children and currently live, work, and contribute to the United States – Dan signed his name to a letter calling on U.S. Congress to take swift action on the Deferred Action for Childhood Arrivals (DACA) program. In 2020, he opposed President Trump's visa ban to limit foreign workers in the U.S.

Awards
Schulman was named by Business Week as one of the top 20 people to watch in media, and was named the Ernst & Young 2009 Entrepreneur of the Year. In 2009 he was named one of the top 25 most powerful people in the global wireless industry. In 2017, the Council for Economic Education honored Schulman with its Visionary Award for promoting economic and financial literacy to create a better informed society.

Fortune included him in the top ten in its 2017 Businessperson of the Year list, its 2018 list, and its 2019 list. In 2017, Schulman was recognized by the Brennan Center for Justice with its Brennan Legacy Award, named after the Supreme Court justice, for his contributions to democratize financial services and build a more inclusive global economy. Schulman was named to Fortune's 2021 list of the World's 50 Greatest Leaders, which recognizes those who in unprecedented times "stepped up to make the world better, and inspired others to do the same." Schulman debuted in 2021, ranking #3 and the highest-ranked business leader.

In 2018, the Center for Financial Services Innovation awarded Schulman the first-ever Financial Health Network Visionary Award for his contributions to a "more accessible and inclusive" financial system.

In 2018, Rutgers University awarded him an honorary doctorate, and he delivered the University's 252nd anniversary commencement speech.

In 2019, Schulman was recognized by Endeavor Global with the High-Impact Leader of the Year Award for his work to support entrepreneurs around the globe. He was also named one of Glassdoor's Top 50 CEOs in 2019.

In 2020, the Robert F. Kennedy Center for Justice and Human Rights honored Schulman with the Ripple of Hope Award, which recognizes those who have demonstrated a commitment to social change and a passion for equality, justice and basic human rights.

Under his leadership, PayPal was named to Time inaugural 100 Most Influential Companies, an honor that recognizes companies making an extraordinary impact around the world.

Schulman was awarded the New York Urban League's 2021 Frederick Douglass Award for his commitment, dedication, and influence to advance the rights of generations of underserved Black Americans.

In December 2021, Schulman was presented the "Voices of Solidarity" award by Vital Voices for his work advocating on behalf of women and girls around the world.

He also delivered the 2022 Middlebury College commencement address, received an honorary Doctor of Letters degree at the same, and was awarded the 2022 Excellence in Economic Empowerment Award by 100 Black Men of New York.

Personal life
When he was CEO of Virgin Mobile, Schulman led a partnership with StandUp For Kids, a nonprofit that distributes survival kits and a hotline number to homeless youth. To get a truer sense of what homeless kids experience, Schulman once spent 24 hours on the streets of New York City, unshaven, wrapped in a blanket, and without money, a watch, or a cell phone.

Schulman has practiced Krav Maga since his teens has stated that he adheres the same philosophy in business. He said in an interview, "there's a philosophy in martial arts which is, 'Never stand still.' Standing still is asking to be hit. You always have to be willing to take some risks going forward. You can't stand still".

He has been a resident of Warren Township, New Jersey, US.

References

20th-century American Jews
American chief executives
Living people
Middlebury College alumni
1958 births
New York University Stern School of Business alumni
Gen Digital people
People from Warren Township, New Jersey
PayPal people
People associated with cryptocurrency
People from Newark, New Jersey
People from Princeton, New Jersey
Princeton High School (New Jersey) alumni
21st-century American Jews